{{Infobox film
| name           = The Shaggy Dog
| image          = File:Official The Shaggy Dog franchise logo.png
| caption        = Official film franchise logo, as released in 2006
| based_on       = 
| starring       = Various actors  (See list below)
| music          = 
| cinematography = 
| editing        = 
| studio         = 
| distributor    = The Walt Disney Company
| released       = 1959–2006
| country        = United States
| language       = English
| budget         = >$60,125,000  (total of 2 films) 
| gross          = >$106,634,280 (total of 3 films)
}}The Shaggy Dog franchise consists of American science fiction-fantasy-comedy films, with three theatrical releases, and two made-for-television films. The overall story is based on the 1923 novel titled The Hound of Florence by Felix Salten. The overarching story of each installment, follows Wilbur "Wilby" Daniels (portrayed by varying actors in each individual film) who is cursed and transforms into a large Old English Sheepdog after attaining an ancient Borgian ring and reciting its inscription.

A reimagined-remake was released in 2006, with Tim Allen in the starring role. Though the overall concept was similar, many aspects of the previous films were changed, and thus has more in common with a reboot. The main character David Douglas becomes a Bearded Collie, after being bitten by a 'sacred dog'. The film genre takes on a slapstick comedy style.

The films were met with mixed to positive critical reception, while the television remake was met with poor reception. Additionally, the second remake was met with predominantly poor box office and critical reception. It made less in box office returns, than its budget. In 1999 the Shaggy Dog films, along with a number of other Disney film series, were expanded as a Walt Disney Parks franchise through a themepark attraction, with elements included from each movie.

 Origin 

The 1923 Austrian fantasy children's novel by Felix Salten, set during the early eighteenth-century Austria and Italy, served as the inspiration for The Walt Disney Company's Shaggy Dog franchise. The story follows the teenage main character, Lukas Grassi. Grassi lost his parents and lives in Vienna, Austria, in poor conditions, and great poverty, but longs to return to his native land Italy; having desires to study art in Florence. Through supernatural means his wish is magically granted, though he must endure taking the form of the archduke's dog, named Kambyses, every-other-day. Grassi travels from Vienna to Florence, and learns that he must continue to live this duality he is cursed to until the archduke will leave Florence for Vienna. However, ending in tragedy, the archduke stabs the dog to death with a dagger, inadvertently killing Lukas.

The novel was first translated into the English language in 1930 by Huntley Paterson. The ending of the book in this iteration differs greatly from the original release. Following the events of the original novel, a wholly new ending of six additional pages was written where: Lucas survives, receives medication, and is united with a courtesan.

Development
Walt Disney originally purchased the film rights to Salten's novel Bambi, a Life in the Woods, 1942. In May 1941 Disney bought the rights to five more of the author's novels, which included options to Salten to adapt them. The novels were Bambi sequels: Bambi's Children and Perri: The Youth of a Squirrel, as well as Renni the Rescuer: A Dog of the Battlefield, City Jungle and The Hound of Florence. Salten did not want to make Bambi's Children, and didn't want anyone else to make it either. He did however, intend to make the other films as animated movies. Before these additional movies could be made, Salten died in Zurich in 1945.

By 1952, ABC wanted Walt Disney to develop a television series for the network. He pitched them The Shaggy Dog, a concept he described as "a story that treated the younger generation and its problems in a light manner". After the pitch was declined, Walt stated: "They turned me down flat. I was hopping mad when I went back to the studio, so I called in Bill Walsh and said 'Let's make a feature of it'". The film's star, Tommy Kirk later acknowledged that the film was originally shot to be a two-part introduction to the television show, stating that the segments were spliced together at the last minute to make a feature film.

Upon release, The Shaggy Dog was the most profitable film at that time, created by Disney. This spawned the continued adaptations and installments in the franchise.

 Films 
 Theatrical 

The Shaggy Dog (1959)

Wilby Daniels, the son of a dog-hating former-mailman named Wilson, accidentally becomes a canine himself when he acquires an ancient Borgian ring and receives its curse. Inadvertently invoking a magical spell engraved upon the centuries-old jewelry, Wilby begins turning into an Old English sheepdog at unpredictable times. Managing his transformations and his personal life becomes more complicated when he overhears a plot to steal secret government information while in dog-form. Wilby sets out on an unexpected adventure, in attempts to stop the criminals from succeeding.

The Shaggy D.A. (1976)

Years after the first film, Wilby Daniels is now a successful lawyer. After returning from vacation only to find his house has been ransacked by burglars, he decides to rid the town of crime by running for district attorney against the corrupt John Slade in the upcoming election. Just as Wilby begins his campaign, he learns that the Borgian ring that has the power to turn him into a large old English sheepdog  has been stolen from a museum. Realizing that the precious jewel and its curse are once again transforming him into a sheepdog at the most inconvenient times, Wilby continues his campaign for D.A. with a greater determination to win the election, regardless.

The Shaggy Dog (2006)

A modern-day adaptation of the film series, The Shaggy Dog (2006) includes elements from the two previous theatrical films.

Deputy District Attorney Dave Douglas is a workaholic, and often places his job responsibilities before his family. After accepting a court case which involves an animal laboratory, he gets bit by a sheepdog. The infection, with a top-secret serum, begins a cycle of transforming Douglas into a Bearded Collie dog. His time as a canine begins to give Dave a new perspective on the importance of his time with his family. He realizes that but before he can make things right with his wife and kids, he must find evidence and prove that those individuals responsible for the concoction that causes his affliction are criminals.

 Television 

During the late-'80s, a sequel to The Shaggy Dog and prequel to The Shaggy D.A. was released exclusively through television broadcast. The film's events take place during the seventeen years between the two stories, and was deemed a success. After this production, The Walt Disney Company continued this trend through the remainder of the '80s and early-'90s, with a number of made-for-television remake films of classic Walt Disney Productions. Produced and released as a part of The Magical World of Disney series, among them, was a television remake of The Shaggy Dog.

The Return of the Shaggy Dog (1987)

Wilby Daniels, now a successful lawyer, is engaged to his girlfriend Betty. A dying Professor Plumcutt bequeaths the ancient Borgian ring to Daniels, only for the professor's evil caretakers to plot a heist in attaining the inherited item for their own nefarious plans. After Wilby attains the ring, the curse that transforms him into a sheepdog is reactivated in the process of foiling the criminals' plans. With the help of his younger brother "Moochie", Wilby sets out to find a way of once again breaking the curse, while assisting his Moochie – an upcoming casting director – in creating the perfect commercial for dogs. The pair seek to stop the henchman, in addition to once again breaking the curse before Wilby and Betty's imminent wedding day.

The Shaggy Dog (1994)

Wilby is a 16-year-old who loves studying science, but can never seem to catch the attention of the girls at school. He learns from his father that the House of Borgia used magic in ancient times to conjure up love, only to unintentionally gain possession of an ancient Borgia ring. Wilby decides to see if improves his love life, and to instead be turned into an Old English Sheepdog. He sets off on a series of comedic adventures, seeking to break the curse.

Original trilogy chronological order
 1959 – The Shaggy Dog – released in 1959
 1960s – The Return of the Shaggy Dog – released in 1987
 1976 – The Shaggy D.A. – released in 1976

Main cast and characters

Related films

The Medfield College appears in The Shaggy D.A. as a primary location. The fictional college appears in two other Disney film franchises, including both the Flubber and the Dexter Riley film series. Collectively, the three separate film series take place within the same fictional universe. Additionally, the Merlin Jones film series take place at the in-universe sister-school, Midvale College; meanwhile, The World's Greatest Athlete is set at the related academic school of Merrivale College.

Additional crew and production details

Reception

Box office and financial performance

 Critical and public response 

Theme park attraction

In 1999, the theme of Journey into Imagination was changed and re-titled to include Figment. The ride features Dr. Nigel Channing, from Honey, I Shrunk the Audience!, who "hosts" an area known as the Imagination Institute. The story states that Channing's grandfather established the institute, while the area features references to Dean Higgins (Head of the Medfield College, where the events of The Shaggy D.A. transpire) from the Dexter Riley films, Wayne Szalinski from the Honey, I Shrunk the Kids franchise, as well as Dr. Philip Brainard from Flubber''. Walt Disney and Thomas Edison also make an appearance.

Explanatory notes

References 

Disney film series